The 2011 Lehigh Valley Steelhawks season was the first season as a professional indoor football franchise and their first in the Indoor Football League (IFL). One of 22 teams competing in the IFL for the 2011 season, the Lehigh Valley Steelhawks were members of the Atlantic Division in the United Conference.

In July, 2010, the Indoor Football League (IFL) announced that there would be an expansion franchise placed in Lehigh Valley for the 2011 season. It was also announced that the team would be owned by Glenn W. Clark, a Wilmington, Delaware businessman. Later in July the team announced that they had named Dan Kuhn as the team's general manager and would be holding a "Name The Team" contest was held to choose a name for the organization. Over 700 names were submitted and the top five were chosen by management. These names were Vipers, Ironmen, Blast, Gamblers, and Steelhawks. Fans were then asked to vote on the name they thought would be best for the team with over 70% of the votes being cast for Steelhawks. Brooke Trautwein, the fan who submitted the Steelhawks name, was given a prize package that included season tickets and Steelhawks' merchandise.

The team played their home games under head coach Chris Thompson at the Stabler Arena in Bethlehem, Pennsylvania. The Steelhawks earned a 4-10 record, placing 2nd in the Atlantic Division, and failed to qualify for post-season play.

Schedule
Key:

Regular season schedule

Roster

Division Standings

References

External links
 Lehigh Valley Steelhawks official website

Lehigh Valley Steelhawks
Lehigh Valley Steelhawks
Lehigh Valley Steelhawks